The first season of CSI: NY originally aired on CBS between September 2004 and May 2005. It consisted of 23 episodes. Its regular time slot was Wednesdays at 10pm/9c.

CSI: NY The Complete First Season was released on DVD in the U.S. on October 18, 2005.

Cast

Main cast
Gary Sinise as Mac Taylor
Melina Kanakaredes as Stella Bonasera
Carmine Giovinazzo as Danny Messer
Vanessa Ferlito as Aiden Burn
Hill Harper as Sheldon Hawkes
Eddie Cahill as Don Flack

Recurring cast
J. Grant Albrecht as Dr. Leonard Giles
Sonya Walger as Jane Parsons
Kelly Hu as Kaile Maka
Chad Lindberg as Chad Willingham

Episodes

Special DVD Features
These features came special on the Complete Season DVD sets. Season 1 consisted of 7 discs. 

Each episode on each of the DVDs for Season 1 also come with a commentary track from the producers of the show. 
DVD 1 has a special episode, "MIA/NYC NonStop". This is the backdoor pilot episode of CSI: NY where Mac Taylor and other New York characters are introduced and who work with Horatio Caine to help solve a crime which started in Miami.
The listing in CSI: NY Seasons 1-3 box set are listed by their Production Number, not the Number In Season. 

Special Features (Disc 7)

The Cast Examines the Characters
The Science Behind the Scenes
CSI: NY - Self Tour
The World's Largest Crime Scene
The Zoo Year

References

External links

CSI: NY Season 1 Episode List on Internet Movie Database
CSI: NY Season 1 Episode Guide on CSI Files
CSI: New York on CBS on The Futon Critic

2004 American television seasons
2005 American television seasons
01